Tehreek-e-Azaadi Jammu and Kashmir (तहरीक-ए-आज़ादी जम्मू और कश्मीर) abbreviated as TAJK is a terrorist front organisation, run by Hafiz Muhammad Saeed. By Indian government, It is claimed to be a front for Jamaat-ud-Dawa (JuD). In June 2017, it was banned by Pakistan after India raised the issue at the Financial Action Task Force (FATF), a global anti-financial terror body at Paris in February 2017. On 8 June 2017, TAJK was placed on the list of "proscribed organisations" by the National Counter Terrorism Authority (NCTA), an Internal Counterterrorism Authority of Pakistan under Interior Ministry.

See also 

 Lashkar-e-Taiba
 All Parties Hurriyat Conference
 Kashmir conflict
 al Qaeda
 List of designated terrorist organizations

References

Hafiz Muhammad Saeed
2017 establishments in Pakistan
Organizations established in 2017
Far-right politics in Pakistan
Jihadist groups in India
Jihadist groups in Pakistan
Jihadist groups in Jammu and Kashmir
Organisations designated as terrorist by India
Organizations based in Asia designated as terrorist
Organisations designated as terrorist by Pakistan
Ahl-i Hadith
Organizations designated as terrorist by the United States
Islamist front organizations